David-Louis, Baron de Constant de Rebecque, seigneur d'Hermenches and Villars-Mendraz, a.k.a. David-Louis Constant d'Hermenches (17 November 1722 in Lausanne – 25 February 1785 in Paris) was a colonel and commandant of a Swiss regiment in the Dutch Republic and Maréchal de camp in French service with Swiss regiments. He is also known for his contact with Voltaire and his correspondence with Isabelle de Charrière.

Early life 

He was the eldest son of Samuel Constant de Rebecque (1676–1756) and his wife, Rose Suzanne née de Saussure de Bercher (1698–1782). His father became member of the Dutch States Army in 1699. Later he started a small Swiss regiment in the Dutch States Army. He bought the seignories Hermenches in 1725 and Villars-Mendraz in 1753.

Career 

Constant d'Hermenches started in the regiment of his father in 1738. They fought at the battle of Fontenoy, where Constant d'Hermenches was wounded. He covered the scar above his left eye with a black band across his forehead. He entered an arranged marriage in 1744 with the daughter of the mayor of Lausanne Louise Anna Jeanne Françoise de Seigneux (1715–1772). In The Hague in 1750 they had a son Guillaume Anne de Constant Rebecque de Villars with as godparents William IV, Prince of Orange and his wife Anne, Princess Royal and Princess of Orange.

He kept up a long correspondence (1760-1776) with Isabelle van Tuyll van Serooskerken, the future Isabelle de Charrière.

Family 

From his first marriage to Louise Anna Jeanne Françoise de Seigneux (1715-1772):
 Guillaume Anne de Constant Rebecque de Villars (The Hague, 24 April 1750 – The Hague, 12 August 1832): married to Constance Francine de Lynden. He was incorporated into the Dutch nobility.
 Constance Louise de Constant de Rebecque (Lausanne, 16 August 1755 – Lausanne, 12 March 1825).
In 1776 he remarried Marie Catherine Philippine de Préseau, née Taisnes de Rémonval (1743-1779).
From this marriage:
 Auguste de Constant de Rebecque (Aubonne, 1 November 1777 - Mézery, 14 February 1862).
He had a daughter out of wedlock with Bénigne Buchet, his housekeeper/nursemaid:
 Sophie Jeanne Louise Joly Dufey (Nernier, summer 1753 - Montheron, 10 January 1841): married François Verdeil.

Works and correspondences
 
 Isabelle de Charrière, [Collected works:] Œuvres complètes, Édition critique par J-D. Candaux, C.P. Courtney, Pierre and Simone Dubois, P. Thompson, J. Vercruysse, D.M. Wood. Amsterdam, G.A. van Oorschot, 1979-1984 10 volumes: Tomes 1-6, Correspondance; tome 10, Essais, Vers, Musique. 
  
Une liaison dangereuse : correspondance [de Belle de Zuylen] avec Constant d’Hermenches (1760-1776), éd. Isabelle et Jean-Louis Vissière, Paris, La Différence, 1991, 
 Aru kiken-na kankei - Agnes to d'Hermenches [Une liaison dangereuse - Agnès et d'Hermenches]. In: Omon Ronso, [Bulletin de la Faculté de droit, Nihon Université, Tokyo] 36 (1993), 40 (1995), 44 (1997), 45 (1997), 46 (1998), 48 (1998), 50 (2000), 52 (2001), 56 (2003), 57 (2003), 61 (2004), 67 (2006), 68 (2007), 70 (2008), 72 (2008). Translation Michikazu Tamai. ISSN 0288-1411
 Aru kikenna kankei : Aniesu to derumanshu. Translation Michikazu Tamai. Tokyo, Surugadai Shuppansha, 2011. 272 p. 
 There are no letters like yours. The correspondence of Isabelle de Charrière and Constant d'Hermences. Translated, with an introduction and annotations by Janet Whatley and Malcolm Whatley. Lincoln NE, University of Nebraska Press, 2000. xxxv, 549 p. 
 
 
 
 Jérôme Vercruysse. La première d'"Olympie". Trois lettres de Mme Denis aux Constant d'Hermenches. Studies on Voltaire and the Eighteenth Century, 1977, 163/19, pp. 19–29 [26 janvier 1762, 9 février 1762, 25 décembre 1773]

Bibliography 
 Dorette Berthoud, David-Louis Constant d'Hermenches et la conquête de la Corse. Revue de la Fondation pour l'histoire des Suisses à l'étranger, 1961, 10, p. 13-18
 Pierre H. Dubois, Ambiguité comme forme de vie. La correspondance de Belle de Zuylen - Constant d'Hermenches. Documentatieblad werkgroep Achttiende eeuw 1975, p. 73 – 88
 Yvette Went-Daoust, La correspondance Belle van Zuylen - Constant d'Hermenches. Enfermement et cosmopolitisme. In: Expériences limites de l'épistolaire. Lettres d'exil, d'enfermement, de folie. Actes du colloque de Caen, 16-18 juin 1991. éd. André Magnan. Paris, Champion, 1993, p. 327-339. 
 Colette Martin Henriette, Isabelle de Charrière, femme de lettres, étude de la correspondence entre Belle de Zuylen/Isabelle de Charrière et David-Louis Constant d'Hermenches.  Dissertation University of Maryland, College Park, 1994.
 Isabelle Vissière, L'encre et le fiel ou La cruauté souriante de Constant d'Hermenches. In: Une Européenne. Isabelle de Charrière en son siècle. Hauterive, Attinger, 1994. p. 229-243
 Isabelle Vissière, Un militaire philosophe: Constant d'Hermenches, In: L'armée au XVIIIe siècle (1715-1789). Actes de colloque du C.A.E.R. XVIII, Aix-en-Provence, 13-14-15 juin 1996  éd. Geneviève Goubier-Robert. Aix-en-Provence, Publications de l'Université de Provence, 1999. p. 241-251
 Isabelle Vissière, Plaidoyer pour Constant d'Hermenches. In: Annales Benjamin Constant, 22, 1999, p. 19-44. 
  Colette Henriette, How Belle de Zuylen's Correspondence with Constant d'Hermenches Shaped Isabelle de Charrière's Literary Works.  In: L'Esprit Créateur, Johns Hopkins University Press, 40, 4, 2000,p. 25-30
 Nathalie Marcoux, Les ruses du corps dans la correspondance d'Isabelle de Charrière (Belle de Zuylen) avec Constant d'Hermenches (1760-1776). La sphère privée. In: Ecritures de la ruse. Publication de la SATOR - Société d'analyse de la topique romanesque, 13e colloque, mai 1999, Toronto / éd.: Elzbieta Grodek. Amsterdam, Rodopi, 2000, p. 125-134. 	
 Monik Richard, Les ruses du corps dans la correspondance d'Isabelle de Charrière (Belle de Zuylen) avec Constant d'Hermenches (1760-1776). La sphère publique. In: Ecritures de la ruse. Publication de la SATOR - Société d'analyse de la topique romanesque, 13e colloque, mai 1999, Toronto / éd.: Elzbieta Grodek. Amsterdam, Rodopi, 2000, p. 135-141. 
 Isabelle Vissière, Lausanne. Un laboratoire littéraire au 18e siècle [Théâtre au château 'Mon Repos']. In: Vie des salons et activités littéraires, de Marguerite de Valois à Mme de Staël. Actes du colloque international de Nancy (6-8 octobre 1999), éd. Roger Marchal. Nancy, Presses Universitaires de Nancy, 2001, p. 233-241.
 Manfred Hinz, Am Ursprung der ‘romantischen‘ Volkshelden. James Boswell, Belle de Zuylen, David-Louis Constant d’Hermenches, und die Korsische Frage. In: Esprit civique und Engagement. Festschrift für Henning Krauß zum 60. Geburtstag. Hrsg. von Hanspeter Plocher. Tübingen, Stauffenburg-Verlag, 2003, p. 187–210
 Jürgen Siess, Inversion de rôles, différence des sexes. Isabelle de Charrière et les deux Constant. In: Cahiers Isabelle de Charrière / Belle de Zuylen papers 3, 2008. p. 24-39
 Jürgen Siess, Isabelle de Zuylen-Charrière. Du désir d'indépendance au projet d'égalité avec les deux Constant. In: Vers un nouveau mode de relations entre les sexes. Six correspondances de femmes des Lumières. [Émilie du Châtelet, Julie de Lespinasse, Marie-Jeanne Riccoboni, Marianne de La Tour, Isabelle de Charrière et Éléonore de Sabran]. Paris, Garnier, 2017. p. 109 - 130

References

External links 
 Historical Dictionary of Switzerland

Swiss mercenaries
Swiss nobility
1722 births
1785 deaths
People from Lausanne
Swiss Protestants
18th-century Swiss military personnel
David-Louis]